Durham County may refer to:

Places
Durham County, New South Wales, Australia
Durham County, Queensland, Australia
Durham County, Western Australia, Australia
Durham County, Ontario, Canada
County Palatine of Durham, historic county, England
County Durham, ceremonial county
County Durham (district), unitary authority area
Durham County, North Carolina, United States

Other uses
Durham County (TV series)

See also
Durham Regional Municipality, Ontario, Canada
Durham (disambiguation)